Ilpoinen (Finnish; Ilpois in Swedish) is a district in the Uittamo-Skanssi ward of the city of Turku, in Finland. It is located in the southeast of the city, and is mainly a high-density residential area.

The current population of Ilpoinen is 2,889, and it is decreasing at an annual rate of 0.14%. 15.26% of the district's population are under 15 years old, while 15.99% are over 65. The district's linguistic makeup is 91.03% Finnish, 6.30% Swedish, and 2.67% other.

See also
 Districts of Turku
 Districts of Turku by population

References

Districts of Turku